John Samuel Sherburne (1757 – August 2, 1830) was a United States representative from New Hampshire and a United States district judge of the United States District Court for the District of New Hampshire.

Education and career

Born in 1757, in Portsmouth, Province of New Hampshire, British America, Sherburne attended Harvard University, graduated from Dartmouth College in 1776 and read law in 1776. During the American Revolutionary War he served in the Continental Army as a brigade staff major. He entered private practice in Portsmouth, New Hampshire from 1776 to 1789, and from 1797 to 1801. He was United States Attorney for the District of New Hampshire from 1789 to 1793, and from 1801 to 1804.

Congressional service

Sherburne was elected as an Anti-Administration candidate from New Hampshire's at-large congressional district to the United States House of Representatives of the 3rd United States Congress and reelected as a Democratic-Republican to the 4th United States Congress, serving from March 4, 1793, to March 3, 1797.

Federal judicial service

Sherburne was nominated by President Thomas Jefferson on March 22, 1804, to a seat on the United States District Court for the District of New Hampshire vacated by Judge John Pickering. He was confirmed by the United States Senate on March 24, 1804, and received his commission on March 26, 1804. His service terminated on August 2, 1830, due to his death in Portsmouth.

Involvement in impeachment, conviction and removal of Pickering

Pickering was the first federal official to be removed from office through impeachment on March 12, 1804. Sherburne, who as a witness for the prosecution managers had aided the case for Pickering's removal even though the latter was insane and did not knowingly commit "high crimes and misdemeanors" on the bench, himself became insane and was for all intents and purposes removed from the bench in 1826, though he continued to receive his salary until his 1830 death.

References

Sources

 

1757 births
1830 deaths
Dartmouth College alumni
Harvard Law School alumni
Politicians from Portsmouth, New Hampshire
New Hampshire militiamen in the American Revolution
People of New Hampshire in the American Revolution
Judges of the United States District Court for the District of New Hampshire
United States federal judges appointed by Thomas Jefferson
19th-century American judges
Continental Army officers from New Hampshire
United States Attorneys for the District of New Hampshire
Democratic-Republican Party members of the United States House of Representatives from New Hampshire
United States federal judges admitted to the practice of law by reading law